The Robert Abell Round Barn, in Logan County near Burnstad, North Dakota, United States, was built in 1942 by Robert Abell.  It was listed on the National Register of Historic Places in 1986.

It cost $800.

References

Barns on the National Register of Historic Places in North Dakota
Infrastructure completed in 1942
Round barns in North Dakota
1942 establishments in North Dakota
National Register of Historic Places in Logan County, North Dakota